Carabus pedemontanus is a species of beetle from family Carabidae, found in France and Italy.

Subspecies include:
 Carabus pedemontanus maurinensis
 Carabus pedemontanus omensis
 Carabus pedemontanus vesubianus

References

pedemontanus
Beetles described in 1892
Beetles of Europe